Susan Visser (born 15 October 1965) is a Dutch film actress. She has appeared in more than forty films and television shows since 1990. She is best known for her role as Anouk Verschuur in Gooische Vrouwen.

Personal life 
Visser was married to actor Roef Ragas, who died in 2007.

Filmography

Film

External links

 
 

Dutch film actresses
Dutch television actresses
Actors from Rotterdam
1965 births
Living people
20th-century Dutch actresses
21st-century Dutch actresses